Yufle is a town in the Sanaag region of Somaliland. The town is 28 km southwest of Erigavo the provincial capital of the region.

In November 2016, the Deputy Minister of Defense of the Republic of Somaliland visited Yufle.

Demographics 

The town is primarily inhabited by the Biciide sub-division of the Habar Jeclo Isaaq clan.

See also
Administrative divisions of Somaliland
Regions of Somaliland
Districts of Somaliland
Somalia–Somaliland border

References

Populated places in Sanaag